Kristen Lee "Kris" Budden (born March 9, 1984) is an American sports reporter currently working for ESPN. Budden is known for reporting on the San Diego Padres as well as being a current sideline reporter for college football and college basketball.

Background
Born in Atlanta, Georgia, on March 9, 1984, Budden moved with her family at age 10 to Dallas, Texas. As a teenager, she shadowed her godfather at his anchor job at WFAA. She attended Trinity Christian Academy, in the Dallas suburb of Addison, where she was a two-time state champion with the school's tennis team. She went on to graduate with honors from University of Missouri's School of Journalism with a broadcast journalism degree.

Career
Budden's first job was as a weekend sports anchor at WCAV in Charlottesville, Virginia. Within 18 months, she moved to WBIR in Knoxville, Tennessee, to work as both a sports anchor and reporter covering the Tennessee Volunteers' athletics programs. Over the course of six years, Budden covered the men's and women's NCAA and SEC basketball tournaments, the 2012 Summer Olympics and Pat Summitt's retirement. At WBIR, Budden received the Tennessee Associated Press Broadcasters' award for Best Breaking Sports News and posted four consecutive second-place finishes in the Best Sports Feature category.

In August 2013, Budden moved to San Diego, California, after accepting a position with Fox Sports. She was, at first, a part of the Fox NFL broadcast crew. In March 2014, she became the sideline reporter for the Padres broadcasts and a fill-in host for the team's pre- and post-game shows. Prior to the 2014 NCAA college football season, she began coverage, mainly as a sideline reporter, for Fox Sports.

Personal life 
Budden is married to Mario Toledo, who was a member of the University of Tennessee men's tennis team from 2000 to 2002. They met in 2012, when she took a lesson from him at a Knoxville racquet club. They were married in Charleston, South Carolina, in April 2014. During Budden's career covering the Padres, Toledo got a job as the assistant tennis coach at Pepperdine University. The couple then moved to Los Angeles, and she switched to covering college football.

See also 
College football on television
List of current Major League Baseball broadcasters

References

1984 births
Living people
American television sports announcers
American television reporters and correspondents
College football announcers
Major League Baseball broadcasters
College basketball announcers in the United States
National Football League announcers
San Diego Padres announcers
Sportspeople from Dallas
Television personalities from Atlanta
Women sports announcers
University of Missouri alumni
American women television journalists
21st-century American women